Dr. Martens, also commonly known as Doc Martens, Docs or DMs, is a German-founded British footwear and clothing brand, headquartered in Wollaston in the Wellingborough district of Northamptonshire, England. Although famous for its footwear, Dr. Martens also makes a range of accessories – such as shoe care products, clothing, and bags. The footwear is distinguished by its air-cushioned sole (dubbed Bouncing Soles), upper shape, welted construction and yellow stitching. Dr Martens' design studio is in Camden Town, London; the manufacturing is in the UK, China, Vietnam, Laos and Thailand. The company is listed on the London Stock Exchange and is a constituent of the FTSE 250 Index.

History

Founding
Klaus Märtens was a doctor in the German Army during World War II. After he injured his ankle in 1945, he found that his standard-issue army boots were too uncomfortable on his injured foot.  While recuperating, he designed improvements to the boots, with soft leather and air-padded soles made of tyres. When the war ended and Germans looted valuables from their own cities, Märtens took leather from a cobbler's shop. With that leather he made himself a pair of boots with air-cushioned soles.

Märtens did not have much success selling his shoes until he met up with an old university friend, Herbert Funck, a Luxembourger, in Munich in 1947. Funck was intrigued by the new shoe design, and the two went into business that year in Seeshaupt, Germany, using discarded rubber shaped by moulds. The comfortable soles were a big hit with housewives, with 80% of sales in the first decade to women over the age of 40.

United Kingdom
Sales had grown so much by 1952 that they opened a factory in Munich. In 1959, the company had grown large enough that Märtens and Funck looked at marketing the footwear internationally. Almost immediately, British shoe manufacturer R. Griggs Group bought patent rights to manufacture the shoes in the United Kingdom. Griggs anglicised the name to "Dr. Martens", slightly re-shaped the heel to make them fit better, added the trademark yellow stitching, and trademarked the soles as AirWair.

The first Dr. Martens boots in the UK, with an eight-eyelet cherry-red coloured smooth leather design known as style 1460, are still in production today, although in many variations. They were introduced on 1 April 1960. The three-eyelet shoe arrived exactly one year later with the style number 1461 (1/4/61). Dr. Martens boots were made in their Cobbs Lane factory in Wollaston, Northamptonshire, where they continued to be made, in addition to production elsewhere, until at least 2018. In addition, a number of shoe manufacturers in the Northamptonshire area and further afield produced the boots under licence, as long as they passed quality standards. The boots were popular among workers such as postmen, police officers and factory workers. By the later 1960s, skinheads started to wear them, "Docs" or "DMs" being the usual naming, and by the late 1970s, they were popular among scooter riders, punks, some new wave musicians, and members of other youth subcultures. The shoes' popularity among politically right-wing skinheads led to the brand gaining an association with violence. Alexei Sayle sang the song "Dr. Martens' Boots" in a 1982 episode of the British TV comedy The Young Ones.

In 1989 Accent Group became the first manufacturer of Dr. Martens outside the UK, obtaining the rights to make them in Dunedin, New Zealand, which they did for several years. The boots and shoes became popular in the 1990s as grunge fashion arose. In late November 1994, a six-storey Dr. Martens department store was opened in Covent Garden in London which also sold food, belts, and watches. At this time the R. Griggs company employed 2,700 people, expected to earn annual revenue of £170 million, and could produce up to 10 million pairs of shoes per year.

Dr. Martens sponsored Rushden & Diamonds F.C. from 1998 to 2005.  Diamonds approached owner and local businessman Max Griggs to request sponsorship from his company.  A new main stand was built at Nene Park in 2001, named the Airwair Stand.  Dr. Martens were also the principal sponsors of Premier League club, West Ham United F.C., renaming the upgraded west stand 'The Dr Martens Stand'.

In 1999 Dr. Martens fought lawsuits in US courts. The brand filed a number of lawsuits in 2016 based primarily on trademark law.

Expansion
In the 2000s, Dr. Martens were sold exclusively under the AirWair name in dozens of different styles, including conventional black shoes, sandals and steel-toed boots. AirWair International Ltd revenue fell from US$412 million in 1999 to $127 million in 2006. In 2003 the Dr. Martens company came close to bankruptcy. On 1 April that year, under pressure from declining sales, the company ceased making shoes in the UK, and moved all production to China and Thailand. Following the closures, the R. Griggs company employed only 20 people in the UK, all in the firm's head office. Five million pairs of Dr. Martens were sold during 2003, half the 1990s level of sales.

In 2004 a new range of Dr. Martens was launched in an attempt to appeal to a wider market, especially young people. The shoes and boots were intended to be more comfortable, and easier to break in, and included some new design elements. Dr. Martens also began producing footwear again at the Cobbs Lane Factory in Wollaston, England in 2004 as part of the "Vintage" line, which the company advertises as being made to the original specifications. Sales of these shoes are low in comparison to those made in Asia, however; in 2010, the factory was producing about 50 pairs per day. In 2005, under turnaround CEO David Suddens the R. Griggs company was given an award by the "Institute for Turnaround" for implementing a successful restructure.

In 2006, Griggs' 1460 Dr. Martens AirWair boot was named in the list of British design icons which included Concorde, Mini, Jaguar E-Type, Aston Martin DB5, Supermarine Spitfire, Tube map, World Wide Web and the AEC Routemaster bus.

Worldwide sales of Dr. Martens shoes grew strongly in the early 2010s, and in 2012 it was the eighth-fastest-growing British company.  Over 100 million pairs of Dr. Martens shoes were sold from 1960 to 2010, and in 2010 the company offered 250 different models of footwear.  The R. Griggs company opened fourteen new Dr. Martens retail stores in the United Kingdom, United States and Hong Kong between 2009 and 2011, and also launched a line of clothing during  2011.

The private equity company Permira acquired R. Griggs Group Limited, the owner of the Dr. Martens brand, for £300 million in October 2013. For a time Dr. Martens footwear was sold under a "for life" scheme, under which it would repair or replace worn-out DM shoes forever for a price somewhat more than twice the normal price for a pair. This offer was available in 2016, but was withdrawn for new sales from May 2018. After Permira purchased Dr. Martens, Steve Murray, former brand president of Vans was hired as CEO. Murray went on to hire Leslie Lane away from DaKine to serve as President of the Americas, former colleague Dan Le Vesconte of Vans as President of EMEA, Darren Campbell of Asics as Head of Product, and Kyle Duford from Nau.

In 2018 ten million pairs of Dr. Martens shoes were produced, only one percent  in the UK.  Annual revenue in 2019 was £454 million, six times more than in 2013.  The most popular model remained the 1460 boots.  In 2019 Dr. Martens announced plans to double the production of shoes and boots in the UK, to 165,000 pairs annually in 2020.  Dr Martens' design studio is in Camden Town, London.

In 2019 The Guardian reported concerns that the quality of Dr. Martens shoes had declined since either production was moved to Asia or Permira acquired the brand.  Many of the newspaper's readers reported that recently produced Dr. Martens products did not last as long as older production.  The company responded that there had been no change in the materials used or production processes since manufacturing was moved to Asia, and only 0.5% of its footwear was defective.

Dr. Martens was listed on the London Stock Exchange at a value of £3.7bn in January 2021.

In January 2022, the Dr Marten factory in Wollaston featured on the BBC programme Inside the Factory; Series 6, Leather boots.

Cultural significance
Dr. Martens have garnered significant following and ownership within various subcultures, notably within the LGBT and punk communities.

Gallery

See also
 Solovair  - a footwear brand, not made by Dr. Martens, made in the original factory in Wollaston
 Totectors - safety footwear brand based in Corby

References

External links

 Official Dr. Martens website

Clothing brands of the United Kingdom
Companies based in Northamptonshire
Clothing companies established in 1947
North Northamptonshire
1947 establishments in Germany
Shoe brands
Shoe companies of the United Kingdom
Skinhead
Wellingborough
1980s fashion
1990s fashion
2000s fashion
2010s fashion
2020s fashion